Latast's snake skink (Ophiomorus latastii) is a species of skink, a lizard in the family Scincidae. The species is endemic to the Near East.

Etymology
The specific name, latastii, is in honor of French herpetologist Fernand Lataste.

Geographic range
O. latastii is found in Israel; Jordan; Palestinian Territory, Occupied; Syria; and possibly Lebanon.

Habitat
The natural habitats of O. latastii are subtropical or tropical dry shrubland and Mediterranean-type shrubby vegetation.

Description
O. latastii is limbless.

Reproduction
O. latastii is viviparous.

Conservation status
The species O. latastii is threatened by habitat loss.

References

Further reading
Boulenger GA (1887). Catalogue of the Lizards in the British Museum (Natural History). Second Edition. Volume III. ..., Scincidæ, ... London: Trustees of the British Museum (Natural History). (Taylor and Francis, printers). xii + 575 pp. + Plates I-XL. (Ophiomorus latastii, new species, p. 398 + Plate XXXIII, Figures 2, 2a).

Ophiomorus
Reptiles of the Middle East
Reptiles of Syria
Taxa named by George Albert Boulenger
Reptiles described in 1887
Taxonomy articles created by Polbot